Tony Davis may refer to:

 Tony Davis (cornerback) (born 1986), American football defensive back, Arizona Cardinals and Penn State
 Tony Davis (Gaelic footballer) (born 1964), Gaelic football player, O'Donovan Rossa, Cork
 Tony Davis (running back) (born 1953), American football running back, Cincinnati Bengals, Tampa Bay Buccaneers, Nebraska
 Tony Davis (1930–2017), British folk singer, member of The Spinners

See also
Anthony Davis (disambiguation)
Anthony Davies (disambiguation), includes Tony Davies
Antonio Davis (born 1968), American basketball player